The National Democratic Front was founded as an umbrella of various opposition movements in North Yemen on February 2, 1976 in Sana'a. The five founding organisations of NDF were the Revolutionary Democratic Party of Yemen, Organisation of Yemeni Revolutionary Resistors, the Labour Party, the Popular Vanguard and the Popular Democratic Union.

On March 5, 1979, the five founding parties of the NDF merged to form the Yemeni Popular Unity Party. Four days later, the Popular Unity Party merged into the Yemeni Socialist Party (but retaining the name 'Popular Unity Party' for activities in North Yemen). The NDF did however continue to exist as a separate structure. It was joined by Qassam Salam's Ba'ath Party, and the Democratic Septembrist Organization. In 1978 the Ba'ath Party left the front and in 1979 the June 13 Front of Popular Forces joined it.

As the National Democratic Front Party
The remnants of the party became known as the  National Democratic Front Party (Ḥizb al-Jabhat al-Wataniyah ad-Dīmuqrātiyah), which still operates and which participated among others in the 2003 Yemeni parliamentary election, where it failed to win a seat and got 0.12% of the vote.

During the Yemeni Revolution, it issued a statement demanding elections to be held as planned on April 27, stressing its importance for political pluralism and the peaceful transfer of power. In September 2014, it signed a statement expressing support for the Houthi takeover in Yemen, which also underlines that this takeover would represent the people of Yemen and not only the Houthis.

References

1976 establishments in North Yemen
Arab nationalism in Yemen
Arab nationalist militant groups
Defunct political parties in Yemen
Defunct political party alliances in Asia
North Yemen
Political parties established in 1976
Socialist parties in Yemen
Rebel groups in Yemen
Yemeni Socialist Party